The Monterrey Fury were a Mexican team playing in a United States based soccer league.  The team was awarded a Major Indoor Soccer League expansion franchise for the 2003–2004 season.  The most notable thing that happened to the team during its first season was that it was forced to forfeit several games after using an illegal player.

Shortly before the start of the 2004–2005 season, the MISL terminated the Fury franchise because of "a long series of non-compliance and disregard for the obligations and responsibilities of an MISL member club."  UANL Tigres, a Mexican 1st Division team, was awarded a new MISL franchise.  However, because of a dispute over who owned the rights to an MISL franchise in Monterrey, the Tigres elected not to complete its purchase of the team, and the MISL voted to discontinue operations in Mexico on December 30, 2004.

Year-by-Year

Head coaches
Andres Carranza (2003–2004)
Erich Geyer (2004)

Arena
Arena Monterrey (2003–2004)

Defunct indoor soccer teams
Football clubs in Monterrey
Mexican indoor football teams
Major Indoor Soccer League (2001–2008) teams
2003 establishments in Mexico
2004 disestablishments in Mexico
Defunct football clubs in Mexico
Association football clubs established in 2003